Email migration is a process in which an email or multiple email messages are migrated from one email client to another email client. An equivalent term is Mailbox Migration, in which case records such as e-mails, appointments, contacts or tasks may also be migrated. In general, email migration is required when a user is switching from its current email client to a new one. Usually, email clients don't support similar file formats for saving mailbox data.

Scenarios 
Mailboxes may be migrated for different reasons. For example, mailboxes may need to be migrated because a company wants to use a new email service provider. Or mailboxes may need to be migrated following a company acquisition or merger. In most cases, a simple one-time migration approach may be employed. However, more advanced scenarios exist, including: 
 Consolidation: email migration is performed to consolidate multiple accounts into one, for example following an employee's departure.
 Backup: email migration is performed to back up or preserve data, for example, to ensure legal compliance.
 Coexistence: email migration is performed for evaluation purposes, for example during a migration pilot.
 Upgrade: email migration is performed to facilitate an upgrade, for example when deploying a new version of an email system.

Procedure 
Various technical procedures are normally used to achieve email migration:
 Email forwarding: this allows a mailbox to forward received content to a designated email address.
 MX record modification: this allows a mail server to process emails on behalf of a designated SMTP domain.
 Content conversion: this allows content to be converted, for example from TNEF to MIME format.
 Property mapping: this allows properties to be mapped, for example from Gmail to Exchange contacts.
 Copy Email: Make a copy of an email from a source mailbox to a destination mailbox

Features 
Email migration solutions may implement different features which determine their suitability for different migration scenarios:
 Supported systems: defines the list of source and destination systems supported (ex: IMAP, Gmail, Exchange).
 Administrative logins: allows administrative login to multiple user mailboxes (ex: using OAuth).
 Multi-pass migrations: allows multiple migrations pass without creating duplicates.
 Scalability: allows a large set of mailboxes to be migrated concurrently.
 Monitoring: allows administrators to monitor migration progress and receive alerts.
 Analytics: allows administrators to access statistics such as transfer speed, error rate, etc.
 Reliability: allows the migration process to automatically handle or retry errors during migration.
 Filtering: allows migration of specific content (ex: date range) from specific locations (ex: folders).
 Security: allows migrated content to remain secure, for example using TLS encryption.

See also 
 Email marketing software
 Email service provider
 E-mail filtering software

References 

Email
Groupware
Exchange